The Libyan House of Representatives (HoR) is the legislature of Libya resulting from the 2014 Libyan parliamentary election, which had an 18% turnout. In late 2014, following the failed coup attempt to take over the capital Tripoli in the context of the Libyan Civil War, the House of Representatives relocated itself to Tobruk in the far east of Libya. Several HoR sessions were held in Tripoli in May 2019 while Tripoli was under armed attack, electing an Interim Speaker for 45 days. Between 2014 and 2021, the House of Representatives supported the Tobruk-based government led by Abdullah al-Thani before supporting the incumbent Government of National Unity led by Abdul Hamid Dbeibeh. In September 2021, the House of Representatives passed a no-confidence motion against the interim GNU government.

History

Formation
The Libyan House of Representatives officially became a legislative body on 4 August 2014, following an election on 25 June 2014, replacing the General National Congress. Turnout at the election was 18%, down from 60% in the first post-Gaddafi election of July 2012. Because of security concerns no voting took place in some locations.

 the chairman was Aguila Saleh Issa.  the deputy presidents of the Council of Deputies were Imhemed Shaib and Ahmed Huma.  , the HoR's associated executive authority was the Second Al-Thani Cabinet, led by Prime Minister Abdullah al-Thani, based in Bayda, Libya.

The Tripoli-based Libyan Supreme Constitutional Court ruled on 6 November 2014 that the June elections were unconstitutional and that the House of Representatives should be dissolved. The House of Representatives rejected the ruling, saying that the ruling was made "at gunpoint", with the court being controlled by armed militias.

In late 2014, a rival parliament in Tripoli was restored, the General National Congress (GNC). The House of Representatives did not recognize the new GNC, and voted on 6 October 2015, 112 out of 131, "to extend its term beyond 20 October", given the inability to hold elections.

Shift to Tobruk
In late 2014, following the occupation of Tripoli by armed Islamist groups during the Second Libyan Civil War, the House of Representatives relocated to Tobruk in the far east of the country. Since there was not enough housing for them, they initially hired a car ferry from a Greek shipping company, the Elyros of ANEK Lines, for members to live and meet in. Later the HoR relocated to the Dar al-Salam Hotel in Tobruk.

Skhirat agreement

In October 2015, the UN envoy for Libya, Bernardino León, announced a proposal for the House of Representatives to share power with the rival new GNC government, under a compromise prime minister, Fayez al-Sarraj. However, the terms of the final proposal were not acceptable to either side, and both rejected it.  Nonetheless, the proposal did spark a revised proposal put together by Fayez al-Sarraj and others, which was subsequently supported by the United Nations. On 17 December 2015 members of the House of Representatives and the new General National Congress signed this revised political agreement, generally known as the "Libyan Political Agreement" or the "Skhirat Agreement". Under the terms of the agreement, a nine-member Presidency Council and a seventeen-member interim Government of National Accord would have been formed, with a view to holding new elections within two years. The House of Representatives would have continued to exist as a legislature and an advisory body, to be known as the High Council of State, would have been formed with members nominated by the New General National Congress. On 31 December 2015, Chairman of the House of Representatives, Aguila Saleh Issa declared his support for the Libyan Political Agreement.

As of April 2016, the Libyan National Elections Commission was still considering its recommendations on legislation to implement the next election of the House of Representatives.

A new round of talks that started in October 2017 in Tunis broke down a month later without a deal. On 17 December 2017, general Khalifa Haftar declared the "so-called" Skhirat agreement void.

2019 Tripoli meetings
Early in April 2019, during the 2019–20 Western Libya campaign, 31 members of the House of Representatives made a public statement supporting the attack on Tripoli and 49 members made a public statement opposing the attack. On 2 May, 51 members of the HoR held a session at the Rixos al-Nasr Hotel. They stated that their session was not intended to split up the HoR nor Libya and called other members of the HoR to attend another Tripoli session planned for 5 May. They opposed the use of military force, called for a political solution to the offensive, and called for the Presidential Council, in its role as the head of the Libyan armed forces, to appoint a new head of the army to replace Khalifa Haftar, who had been appointed by the HoR on 2 March 2015.

On 5 May, a Tripoli session of 47 members of the House of Representatives elected al-Sadiq al-Kehili as Interim Speaker, Musaab al-Abed as a rapporteur and Hammuda Siala as a spokesperson, for a period of 45 days, with 27 votes in favour.
In the 2014 Libyan parliamentary election, al-Kehili was elected with 1596 votes in electorate 56, Tajura; Musaab al-Abed (Musab Abulgasim) was elected with 2566 votes in electorate 59, Hay al-Andalus; and Sayala (Siyala) was elected with 6023 votes in electorate 58, Tripoli Central. On 8 May, another session was held in Tripoli, creating an Internal Code Review committee, to review HoR decisions made since 2014, under Article 16 of the Skhirat Agreement; an International Communication committee; a Secretarial Office; and a Crisis committee, to "follow" the work of the emergency committee created by the Presidential Council in relation to the 2019 Western Libya offensive. Sayala stated in a televised interview that solving the crisis in Libya would require a political agreement in which the HoR is "restored" as the highest legislative authority in Libya.

Disappearances

On 17 July 2019, one of the Benghazi members of the House of Representatives, Seham Sergewa, well-known for her documentation of rape as a weapon of war during the 2011 Libyan Civil War, was detained by the Libyan National Army (LNA). , her location was unknown.

Government of National Unity
On 10 March 2021, the House of Representatives met in the central city of Sirte to formally approve the formation of a Government of National Unity (GNU) led by Mohamed al-Menfi as chairman of the Presidential Council and Abdul Hamid Dbeibeh as Prime Minister. 121 members of the House voted to approve the formation of the unity government. The Government of National Unity was seeking to unify the rival Government of National Accord based in Tripoli and the Second Al-Thani Cabinet based in Tobruk.

On 21 September, the House of Representatives passed a no-confidence vote against the GNU led by Abdul Hamid Dbeibeh after 83 out of the 113 members present voted for the motion, thus practically acknowledging support for the Government of National Stability.

Government of National Stability 
On 10 February 2022, the House of Representatives selected Fathi Bashagha as prime minister-designate, after HoR Speaker Aguila Saleh announced the only other candidate, Khalid Al-Baybas, withdrew his candidacy. However, Al-Baybas has denied withdrawing from the race. Prime Minister of the GNU Abdul Hamid Dbeibeh rejected Bashagha's appointment as prime minister, stating that he will only hand power after a national election. Khalifa Haftar and his Libyan National Army welcomed Bashagha's appointment. Civilian and military leaders in Misrata rejected the formation of a new government and declared support for the GNU. Egypt’s foreign ministry supported the “new government,” but the United Nations said it continued to recognize Mr. Dbeiba’s leadership.

On 1 March, the House of Representatives voted to give confidence to Bashagha's Government of National Stability (GNS). According to HoR Speaker Saleh, 92 out of 101 attending members voted for the new government. A HoR member raised questions about the validity of the vote by stating that 10 votes from absent members were cast via voice messages sent to the Speaker. The High Council of State rejected "unilateral" steps by the HoR and regards the HoR decision to grant confidence to a new government a violation of the Libyan Political Agreement. The United Nations has voiced concerns over the vote due to reports on lack of transparency and procedure, and acts of intimidation prior to the HoR session.

See also
High Council of State (Libya)
Libyan Civil War (2014–2020)
Libyan Crisis (2011–present)
2014 Libyan parliamentary election

References

External links
Official website
Official Facebook page

 
Politics of Libya
Political organizations based in Libya
Libya
Libya
2014 establishments in Libya